FC Nemkom Krasnodar was a Russian football team from Krasnodar. It played professionally for a single season in 2002 in the Russian Second Division, taking 18th place in the Zone South, the club was relegated back to amateur level and subsequently disbanded.

External links
  Team history by footballfacts

Association football clubs established in 2000
Association football clubs disestablished in 2003
Nemkom
2000 establishments in Russia
2003 establishments in Russia